Teleutaea is a genus of parasitoid wasps belonging to the family Ichneumonidae.

The species of this genus are found in Europe.

Species:
 Teleutaea acarinata Kuslitzky, 1973 
 Teleutaea arisana Sonan, 1936

References

Ichneumonidae
Ichneumonidae genera